WWOK-LP (95.3 FM) is a non-commercial LPFM radio station located in Greenville, South Carolina, that features Easy Listening music. The station is licensed by the FCC to broadcast with an ERP of 1 watt.

Station history
WWOK-LP signed on February 5, 2004. It is owned by Missionary Broadcasters Inc.

External links

WOK-LP
WOK-LP
Radio stations established in 2004